Madifushi (Dhivehi: މަޑިފުށި) is one of the islands of Meemu Atoll.

Geography

References

Islands of the Maldives